Florence Namayanja (born 4 October 1960) is a female Ugandan politician who was district woman representative of Bukoto County East, Masaka District. She was affiliated to the Democratic Party political party and now affiliated to National Unity Platform. In the 11th Parliament, she stood as the Candidate for LC5 Chairperson for Masaka City under the National Unity Platform although she lost the elections. She was  the winner of Masaka city mayoral seat after defeating seven candidates including business tycoon, Emmanuel Lwasa with 28,824 votes.

Background and education 
Namayanja was born to the late John  Kisomose Mukasa and Pirajiya Namatove and she is fifth born in a family of eight children. In 1978,she attained her Uganda Certificate of Education from Masaka S.S.S. and after joined Makerere Day and Evening Classes for Adults for her Uganda Advanced Certificate of Education and she completed it in 2003. She holds a Certificate in Human Resource Management in Local Governments (2004) and a Certificate in Leadership and Management (2005) from Uganda Management Institute.  In 2007, she joined Makerere University for her bachelor's degree in Industrial and Organizational Psychology. In the same year (2007), she was awarded a Certificate in Building Communities of Character from Character Training Institute, Oklahoma.

Work experience 
She was the Administrator at National Water and Sew.Corp (1981-1994). She later was employed as the Member of Council at Mulago School of Nursing (2008-2009) and Kyambogo University Council (2006-2011). In the same year (2006-2011), she served as the Board Member at National Water & Sewerage Corporation. Additionally, she was the  Councilor LC5 (2001-2006) and Deputy Mayor Kampala City (2006-2011).

Political experience 
From 2011 to 2016, she was the Member of Parliament of Uganda at the Parliament of Uganda in the ninth and tenth parliament. She served on additional role at the Parliament of Uganda on the Committee on Natural Resources, and Committee on Commissions, State Authorities & State Enterprises.

Personal life 
She is divorced. Her hobbies are exploring new things, and making new friends. She is a Rotarian and a Women Leader (Head of DP Women League).

Controversy 
Florence Namayanja and Dr Abed Bwanika, the National Unity Platform- NUP presidential candidate were arrested during protests that followed the arrest of Robert Kyagulanyi Ssentamu.  They were arrested together with Evan Kanyike, the Bukoto East NUP parliamentary candidate and Juliet Kakande Nakabuye, Masaka Woman parliamentary candidate and charged with inciting violence and doing an act likely to spread infectious diseases, under section 171 of the Penal Code Act. They were later released on bail.

See also 
 List of members of the tenth Parliament of Uganda
 Alintuma Nsambu
 Masaka District
 List of members of the ninth Parliament of Uganda
 Parliament of Uganda
 Member of Parliament
 National Unity Platform

References

External links 
 Website of the Parliament of Uganda
 Florence Namayanja on Twitter
 florence namayanja on Linkedin
 Florence Namayanja on Facebook

Living people
1960 births
People from Masaka District
Women members of the Parliament of Uganda
Members of the Parliament of Uganda
Uganda Management Institute alumni
Makerere University alumni
21st-century Ugandan politicians
21st-century Ugandan women politicians
National Unity Platform politicians